The East Branch of the Saco River is a  river in the White Mountains of New Hampshire in the United States. It is a tributary of the Saco River, which flows to the Atlantic Ocean in Maine.

The East Branch rises near the northern boundary of Jackson, New Hampshire, in an area just south of the Wild River, east of Black Mountain, and southwest of the Baldface mountains. The river flows south through the White Mountain National Forest in an area that is devoted more to logging than other portions of the forest. Leaving the forest, the river enters the town of Bartlett, reaching the Saco River at Lower Bartlett village, just downstream of the Ellis River confluence with the Saco.

See also

List of rivers of New Hampshire

References

Rivers of New Hampshire
Saco River
Rivers of Carroll County, New Hampshire